The Women's 4 × 5 kilometre relay event of the FIS Nordic World Ski Championships 2017 was held on 2 March 2017.

Results
The race was started at 15:00.

References

Women's 4 x 5 kilometre relay
2017 in Finnish women's sport